Telekom Baku (formerly named Rabita Baku) was an Azerbaijani women's volleyball club. Telekom was an eight-time champion of Azerbaijani Superleague and the winner of the 2011 FIVB Club World Championship.

History

The Rabita Bank was founded in 2001 as Rabitachi Baku, and then took Rabita Baku in 2004. Club participated for the first time in an official competition in the European CEV Cup 2007–08, but was eliminated immediately by OK Hit Nova Gorica.

In the season 2008–09, reaches the quarter-finals of the Challenge Cup and was eliminated from the Club Voleibol Albacete and wins for the first time the championship in the final against Azerrail. The season 2009-10 campaign starts with a good buy: the team wins the championship again and get the third place in the CEV Cup, losing in the semifinals against Futura Volley Busto Arsizio, but winning the final for bronze against VC Uralochka-NTMK Yekaterinburg.

In the season 2010 - 11, club participated for the first time in the Women's CEV Champions League and reached final of this competition, just losing to VakıfBank of Turkey.

Rabita hosted the 2013–14 CEV Champions League Final Four, there the club won the Bronze medal after falling 0–3 to the Russian Dinamo Kazan in the semifinals, but defeating 3–0 to the Turkish Eczacıbaşı VitrA Istanbul in the third place match.

After eight Azerbaijani Superleague titles, in 2015 Rabita Baku merged with Telekom Baku adopting the name of the latter, due to financial difficulties but retained the commitments in the Azerbaijani Superleague and the 2015–16 CEV Champions League and transferring to the new team the Telekom young players.

Team

As Telekom Baku
Season 2016–2017, as of November 2016.

As Rabita Baku

Honours

International success
  FIVB Volleyball Women's Club World Championship:
  Champion (1): 2011
  Runners-up (1): 2012
  Women's CEV Champions League:
  Runners-up (2):  2010-2011, 2012-2013
  Third (1): 2013-2014

Domestic success
  Azerbaijan Superleague:
  Winners (7): 2008–09, 2009–10, 2010–11, 2011–12, 2012-13,  2013-14, 2014–15
  Runners-up (5): 2003–04, 2004–05, 2005–06, 2006–07, 2007–08
  Third (1): 2002-03

References

External links

Volleyball in Azerbaijan
CEV Profile

Azerbaijani volleyball clubs
Volleyball clubs established in 2004
2004 establishments in Azerbaijan
Sports teams in Baku